Roger D. Launius (born May 15, 1954) is an American historian and author of Lithuanian descent, a former chief historian of NASA. He retired in 2016 as Associate Director for Collections and Curatorial Affairs for the Smithsonian National Air and Space Museum in Washington, D.C. Launius is a consulting historian in air and space history. He has written many books on space flight, and also published on the history of the Latter Day Saint movement.

Early life and education
Launius was born in Galesburg, Illinois, and was raised in Greenville, South Carolina. He graduated from Graceland College in 1976 and received a PhD in history in 1982 from Louisiana State University.

Career
From 1982 to 1990, Launius held several positions as a civilian historian with the United States Air Force. Between 1990 and 2002, he was the chief historian for NASA. In 2001, he held the Charles A. Lindbergh Chair in Aerospace History at the Smithsonian. From 2002-2006 he was Chair of the Division of Space History at the Smithsonian National Air and Space Museum. From 2006-2013 he was Senior Curator,  and from 2013-2016 Launius was Associate Director for Collections and Curatorial Affairs at the same institution.

Launius contributed space policy analysis in the wake of the Columbia Accident Investigation Board 2003 report.  He has been a regular commentator on space-related issues for the news media.

 He was president of the Mormon History Association in 1993–94 and was president of the John Whitmer Historical Association in 1991–92.

Publications

Launius has written more than twenty books and 100 articles on the history of aerospace. Some titles include Historical analogs for the stimulation of space commerce (2014), Space shuttle legacy : how we did it and what we learned (2013), and Exploring the Solar System: The History and Science of Planetary Probes (2012). He has twice won the AIAA History Manuscript Award, forComing Home: Reentry and Recovery from Space in 2011, and for Space Stations: Base Camps to the Stars in 2003.

Launius has published on the history of the Latter Day Saint movement. He won both the David Woolley Evans and Beatrice Evans Biography Award (1989) and the John Whitmer Historical Association Best Book Award for his work on Mormon history, Joseph Smith III: Pragmatic Prophet.

Launius studies the history of baseball in the United States, and published Charlie Finley: The Outrageous Story of Baseball's Super Showman with G. Michael Green''.

Awards and honors
Launius other awards include:

 John F. Kennedy Astronautics Award, American Astronautical Society, 2009, as an "individual  who  has  made  an outstanding contribution to public service through leadership in promoting our space programs for the exploration and utilization of outer space".
 Secretary's Research Prize, Smithsonian Institution, 2009.
 Roger R. Trask Award, Society for History in the Federal Government, 2009.
 Director's Award, National Air and Space Museum, 2008.
 Harmon Memorial Lecturer in Military History, United States Air Force Academy, 2006.
 NASA Distinguished Service Medal, 2001.
 NASA Exceptional Service Medal, 1999.
 Charles Thomson Prize, 1995, 1998, 2008, 2012

Launius is a fellow of the American Association for the Advancement of Science (2007), the American Astronomical Society (2001), and the International Academy of Astronautics (2007). He is an Associate Fellow of the American Institute for Aeronautics and Astronautics (2008).

References

External links

1954 births
Living people
Air force historians
21st-century American historians
21st-century American male writers
American members of the Community of Christ
Graceland University alumni
Historians of aviation
Historians of the Latter Day Saint movement
Louisiana State University alumni
NASA people
Writers from Greenville, South Carolina
Smithsonian Institution people
United States Air Force civilians
American people of Lithuanian descent
American male non-fiction writers